José Antonio Colado Castro (born 30 October 1976 in Seville) is a retired Spanish sport shooter. He has been selected to compete for Spain in pistol shooting at the 2004 Summer Olympics, and has attained top 8 finishes in a major international competition, spanning the Mediterranean Games and the ISSF World Cup series. Colado also trains under head coach Cezary Staniszewski for twelve years as a full-fledged member of the Spanish pistol shooting team.

Colado qualified for the Spanish team in pistol shooting at the 2004 Summer Olympics in Athens. He managed to get a minimum qualifying score of 578 to gain an Olympic quota place for Spain in the air pistol, following his outside-final finish at the European Championships in Gothenburg, Sweden one year earlier. In the 10 m air pistol, held on the first day of the Games, Colado shot a total of 572 to force a two-way tie with host nation Greece's Dionissios Georgakopoulos for a lowly thirty-third place, slashing six points off from his entry standard. Three days later, in the 50 m pistol, Colado put up another dismal display from his air pistol feat to end up in a thirty-fourth place tie with Cuba's Norbelis Bárzaga at 542, trailing his fellow marksman Isidro Lorenzo by a wide, twenty-point gap.

In early 2015, Colado served full-time as the sports technical director of the pistol team for the Royal Spanish Olympic Shooting Federation, just eleven years since his immediate Olympic debut.

Notes

References

External links
 
 
 

1976 births
Living people
Spanish male sport shooters
Olympic shooters of Spain
Shooters at the 2004 Summer Olympics
Sportspeople from Seville
21st-century Spanish people